Emamzadeh Shah Esmail (also Romanized as Emāmzādeh Shāh Esmā‘īl) is a village in Jangal Rural District, in the Central District of Fasa County, Fars Province, Iran. At the 2006 census, its population was 13, in 5 families.

References 

Populated places in Fasa County